The Church of La Recolección is a Catholic rectory located in the historic center of the city of León, Nicaragua. It is located in the El Sagrario neighborhood and is part of the parish territory of the Holy Cathedral Church of León. It was founded as the Oratory of Nuestra Señora de Dolores by the recollected fathers of the Oratory of Saint Philip Neri. The first stone was laid in 1786 and it was consecrated in 1788. It is currently run by the Paules Fathers.

History
The first stone of la Recollección was placed by Bishop Juan Félix de Villegas on December 5, 1786 and it was consecrated in 1788. Its patron saint is Our Lady of Sorrows and the co-patron saint is St. Philip Neri. The Congregation of Oratory of Saint Philip Neri came from Nicaragua in late 18th century, after the state decree that ignores the perpetuity of vows and confiscates the land of religious houses.

Jesuit rectory
After the expulsion of the religious orders, La Recolección was run by the diocesan clergy. In 1871 the Jesuits were expelled from Guatemala and they took asylum in Nicaragua. They were greeted with great enthusiasm by the entire nation and were quickly ushered into the Recolección. Here they founded a school and a religious house. The poet Rubén Darío frequented the house of the Jesuit fathers quite a bit and would later give several testimonies of his stay with the Jesuit fathers. In 1872, the Servant of God Mariano Dubón received his cassock in this church from the Jesuit fathers.

In this religious house lived the R.P. León Tornero, SJ, author of a book of verses that contained 66 compositions in honor of the Blessed Virgin. This book was published in 1872 with the attorney of the Bishop of Nicaragua, D. Manuel Ulloa y Calvo. The Jesuits also brought to Nicaragua the most widespread form of prayer for the Month of Mary, whose text was originally used by the Congregation of Mary.

Vincentian rectory
In 1881, after having long stayed in Nicaragua, the Jesuit fathers were expelled from the republic and the church once again belonged to the secular clergy. In January 1892 Monsignor Simeón Pereira y Castellón was ordained a subdeacon and deacon by the Bishop of Honduras Bishop Manuel Francisco Velez. After the earthquake of April 28, 1898, the Daughters of Charity left the old Hospital San Vicente next to San Juan de Dios and concentrated in the Colegio La Recolección, where they remain to this day. That same year the Pauline fathers arrived, who remain the rectors of that church to this day.

Description

La Recolección is most famous for its façade carved from quarry stone in the Mexican Baroque style. Its design is Altarpiece style, with five streets and four bodies. The side streets have the emblems of passion. The central street has the door of the church, a window to the choir and the emblems of the Blessed Sacrament, the True Cross and the Risen One. An image of the Miraculous Medal currently crowns the façade. To the south side of the façade stands the bell tower.

The interior of the chapel consists of a rood screen, a chapel to the Holy Face, three naves and a presbytery. The north and south walls have altarpieces of Our Lady of Perpetual Help and Our Lady of Guadalupe respectively. They are Baroque-style altarpieces with a Neoclassical influence that match the main altar. The altars in the north and south naves are dedicated to the Sacred Heart and the Infant Jesus of Prague. The main altarpiece is of Baroque style with Neoclassical influence. In the main niche is the image of the Immaculate Conception of the Miraculous Medal. In the side niches are Saint Joseph and Saint Vincent de Paul. The altarpiece is crowned by the reverse of the Miraculous Medal, with the Cross and the M of the name of Mary. The chancel is under a barrel vault. The church also has a beautiful carving of the Blood of Christ.

Festivals
The main festivals are in the month of November in honor of the Miraculous Medal. Formerly it was celebrated with great pomp and the exercise of the month of November was prayed in honor of the Miraculous Medal, as well as the Novena in his honor. The Archconfraternity of la Santa Faz celebrates the Veil of Veronica on the Tuesday before Ash Wednesday and in the month of April, with great pomp and ceremony. Formerly this church took out a procession of Souls on Tuesday of the Week of Sorrows. The processions of said week were suppressed by a diocesan synod at the beginning of the 20th century. The procession of the Agony in the Garden also took place on Holy Tuesday.

References

Roman Catholic churches in León, Nicaragua
Roman Catholic churches completed in 1788
1786 establishments in the Spanish Empire
Baroque architecture in Nicaragua

es:Iglesia de La Recolección (León, Nicaragua)